Pseudomethoca is a genus of velvet ants in the family Mutillidae. There are at least 20 described species in Pseudomethoca.

Species
These 24 species belong to the genus Pseudomethoca:

 Pseudomethoca anthracina b
 Pseudomethoca athamas b
 Pseudomethoca bequaerti b (striped velvet ant)
 Pseudomethoca brazoria b
 Pseudomethoca contumax b
 Pseudomethoca diligibilis Mickel, 1952 g
 Pseudomethoca donaeanae b
 Pseudomethoca flammigera b
 Pseudomethoca frigida b
 Pseudomethoca oceola b
 Pseudomethoca oculata b
 Pseudomethoca paludata b
 Pseudomethoca pergrata Cresson, 1902 g
 Pseudomethoca plagiata (Gerstäcker, 1874) g
 Pseudomethoca praeclara b
 Pseudomethoca propinqua (Cresson, 1865) b
 Pseudomethoca puchella Mickel, 1952 g
 Pseudomethoca pumila Burmeister, 1855 g
 Pseudomethoca quadrinotata b
 Pseudomethoca sanbornii b
 Pseudomethoca simillima (Smith, 1855) b
 Pseudomethoca torrida Krombein, 1954 b
 Pseudomethoca vanduzei b
 Pseudomethoca virgata Mickel, 1952 g

Data sources: i = ITIS, c = Catalogue of Life, g = GBIF, b = Bugguide.net

References

Further reading

External links

 

Parasitic wasps
Mutillidae